143rd Division may refer to:

 143rd Division (Imperial Japanese Army)
 143rd Division (People's Republic of China, first formation)
 143rd Division (People's Republic of China, second formation)
 143rd Division (People's Republic of China, third formation)